"I Still..." is a song from American vocal group Backstreet Boys' fifth studio album, Never Gone (2005). It was released as the third and final single from the album outside the United States on November 25, 2005. The single reached the top 40 in Australia and Greece. This was the last single the band released with Kevin Richardson until 2012.

Music video
The music video depicts the group in a dark urban setting. Each member is filmed in his own setting: Kevin Richardson in a bar, Howie Dorough in a cab, Nick Carter at a bus stop, Brian Littrell on the street and AJ McLean in an alley. The video was directed by Matt McDermitt, whom The Boston Globe reported to be only 19 years old at the time of filming. The music video is noted for its use of slow-motion technique.

Track listings
 European CD single
 "I Still..." (album version) – 3:49
 "Just Want You to Know" (Jason Nevins remix radio edit) – 3:43

 Australian CD single
 "I Still..." (album version) – 3:49
 "I Still..." (Passengerz remix) – 3:17
 "Just Want You to Know" (Jason Nevins extended mix) – 6:30
 "I Still..." (video enhancement)

 Japanese CD single
 "I Still..." (album version)
 "I Still..." (Passengerz remix)
 "Show Me the Meaning of Being Lonely" (live)
 "Larger than Life" (live)
 "Just Want You to Know" (Jason Nevins remix radio edit)
 "Just Want You to Know" (video enhancement)
 "I Still..." (video enhancement)

Charts

Release history

References

2005 songs
2006 singles
Backstreet Boys songs
Jive Records singles
Song recordings produced by Max Martin
Song recordings produced by Rami Yacoub
Songs written by Max Martin
Songs written by Rami Yacoub